Little Bow Provincial Park is a provincial park located near the town of Vulcan and the village of Champion in Alberta, Canada.

The area is noted for recreational boating and fishing. The Little Bow Reservoir Provincial Recreation Area is an extension of the park. It was established on January 20, 1954 and is maintained by Alberta Tourism, Parks and Recreation.

Activities
The following activities are available in the park:
Beach activities
Birdwatching (as part of the "McGregor Lake & Travers Reservoir Important Bird Area")
Camping
Canoeing and kayaking
Group camping
Horseshoes
Fishing and ice fishing
Power boating
Sailing
Swimming
Water-skiing
Windsurfing

See also
List of provincial parks in Alberta
List of Canadian provincial parks
List of Canadian national parks

References

External links

Provincial parks of Alberta
Vulcan County